Damiano Damiani (23 July 1922 – 7 March 2013) was an Italian screenwriter, film director, actor and writer. Poet and director Pier Paolo Pasolini referred to him as "a bitter moralist hungry for old purity", while film critic Paolo Mereghetti said that his style made him "the most American of Italian directors".

In 1946 Damiano Damiani became part of the so-called Group of Venice with Fernando Carcupino, Hugo Pratt and Dino Battaglia.

Life and career
Born in Pasiano di Pordenone, Friuli, Damiani studied at the Accademia di Brera in Milan, then made his début in 1947 with the documentary La banda d'Affari. After a few years as a screenwriter, he directed his first feature film in  1960, Il rossetto.

Before his career as a big screenwriter, Damiani was first a comic cartoonist in association with the "Group of Venice". Focused on the comic Asso di Picche (1945–49) the comic featured a masked vigilante who fights crime all over the globe and is in charge of the crime stopping organization, "Band of Panthers".

A smaller publication to which he also contributed through illustration was Mike Lazy (1946) producing two volumes in Albo Dinamite by Edizioni Il Carro in Milan. Then individually producing his own gangster comic, Pat la Rocca (1946). Two books were published in the collection Collana Gialli Film, also by Edizioni Il Carro. A third comic was scheduled and advertised to release yet never materialized.
 
Continuing his work in the comic industry, Damiani wrote scripts for the photo comic strip Arizona Kid (1949) published in Mondadori magazines such as Avventuroso Film and Bolero Film. Moving on to work on the launch of a similar magazine, Sogno, alongside editor Luciano Pedrocchi, he also  later worked as a screenwriter for an adventure comic I Tre Boyscouts (Edizioni Castello, 1948; which was illustrated by Rino Ferrari, Giovanni Benvenuti and Andrea Bresciani). Later in his career, Damiani did some illustration work for the crime noir comic, Hogart il Giustiziere, which was reprinted and published under the title Bogart il Giusitiziere (1968–69).

His 1962 film, Arturo's Island, won the Golden Shell at the San Sebastián International Film Festival. The 1960s were Damiani's "golden decade"; he was praised by critics and his films were box office successes.

In 1966, he directed A Bullet for the General, one of the first political " Spaghetti Westerns". In 1968, with The Day of the Owl, he started a series of films in which social criticism, often related to the connections between politics and crime, was mixed with spectacular plots. His 1971 film Confessions of a Police Captain won the Golden Prize at the  7th Moscow International Film Festival.

In 1973 Damiani débuted as an actor, playing Giovanni Amendola in Florestano Vancini's The Matteotti Murder. He was known to cult horror film fans for directing Amityville II: The Possession in 1982 for Dino de Laurentiis.

In 1984, he directed one of the most famous Italian television series, La piovra, a description of the contemporary Italian Mafia and its involvement in politics. His last feature film was Assassini dei giorni di festa , directed in 2002.

Death
Damiani died on 7 March 2013, at his home in Rome, from respiratory failure; he was 90 years old.

Filmography

Screenwriter
 The Mysteries of Paris (1957)
 Herod the Great (1958)
 Head of a Tyrant (1959)

Director

 Lipstick (Il rossetto, 1960) 
 Blood Feud (1961) aka Il sicario (1960) 
 Arturo's Island (L'isola di Arturo, 1962)
 The Empty Canvas (La noia, 1963)
 The Reunion (La rimpatriata, 1963)
 The Witch in Love (La strega in amore, 1966)
 A Bullet for the General (El Chuncho, quien sabe?, 1966)
 The Day of the Owl also known as Mafia (Il giorno della civetta, 1967)
 A Complicated Girl (Una ragazza piuttosto complicata, 1968)
 The Most Beautiful Wife (La moglie più bella, 1970)
 Confessions of a Police Captain (Confessioni di un Commissario di Polizia al Procuratore della Repubblica) (1971)
 The Case Is Closed, Forget It (L'istruttoria è chiusa: dimentichi, 1972)
 The Assassin of Rome (Girolimoni, il mostro di Roma, 1972)
 The Devil Is a Woman (Sorriso del grande tentatore, 1974)
 How to Kill a Judge (Perché si uccide un magistrato, 1974)
 A Genius, Two Partners and a Dupe (Un genio, due compari, un pollo, 1975)
 Goodbye and Amen (Goodbye e amen, 1977)
 I Am Afraid (Io ho paura) (1977)
 A Man on His Knees (Un uomo in ginocchio) (1978)
 The Warning (L'Avvertimento, 1980)
 Amityville II: The Possession (1982)
 Parole e sangue (1983, TV)
 La piovra (1984, TV)
 Pizza Connection (1985)  
 The Inquiry (L'inchiesta, 1986)
 Imago urbis (1987)
 Massacre Play (1989)
 Lenin...The Train (1990, TV)
 The Dark Sun (Il sole buio, 1990)
 Man of Respect (Uomo di rispetto) (1992)
 L'angelo con la pistola (1992)
 Una bambina di troppo (1994, TV)
 Ama il tuo nemico (1999, TV)
 Alex l'ariete (2000)
 Ama il tuo nemico 2 (2001, TV)
 Another World Is Possible (2001)
 Assassini dei giorni di festa (2002)

Actor
 7 Bullets for Gringo (1967) - Journalist with Gen. Elías (uncredited)
 The Case Is Closed, Forget It (1971) - Vanzi's lawyer (uncredited)
 The Assassination of Matteotti (1973) - Giovanni Amendola
 How to Kill a Judge (1975) - Giacomo Solaris' Attorney (uncredited) (final film role)

Awards
 Golden Seashell at San Sebastian Film Festival for L'isola di Arturo (1962)
 Berlin FIPRESCI Prize - Honorable Mention, for La rimpatriata(1963)
 Silver Berlin Bear - Honorable Mention for Pizza Connection(1985)
 David di Donatello, Alitalia Award,  for L'Inchiesta (1986)
 Golden Prize at Moscow Film Festival for Confessione di un commissario di polizia al procuratore della repubblica (1971)

Nominations
Golden Berlin Bear for Pizza Connection (1985)
Golden Berlin Bear for  Il giorno della civetta  (1968)
Golden Berlin Bear for  La rimpatriata (1963)

See also 
 Fernando Carcupino
 Hugo Pratt 
 Dino Battaglia

References

External links

1922 births
2013 deaths
People from the Province of Pordenone
Giallo film directors
Italian film directors
Italian screenwriters
Spaghetti Western directors
Poliziotteschi directors
Deaths from respiratory failure
Italian male screenwriters